The Well-Beloved: A Sketch of a Temperament is a novel by Thomas Hardy. It spans forty years, and follows Jocelyn Pierston, a celebrated sculptor who attempts to create in stone the image of his ideal woman, while he tries also to find her in the flesh.

It was serialized in 1892, and published as a book in 1897.

The main setting of the novel, the Isle of Slingers, is based on the Isle of Portland in Dorset, southern England.

Many of Hardy's novels were set in Dorset. The Well Beloved is one of Hardy's last novels. It was first published in three-part serial form in 1892, and then revised and re-published as a book in 1897, after Hardy's last novel Jude the Obscure (1895). The novel tells the story of the sculptor Jocelyn Pierston's search for the ideal woman, through three generations of a Portland family.

A cottage housing what is now part of Portland Museum, on the Isle of Portland, founded by Marie Stopes, a friend of Hardy and his wife, was an inspiration for the book. The cottage acted as the home of Avice, the novel's heroine.

References

External links

 

1897 British novels
Novels by Thomas Hardy
Isle of Portland
English novels
Novels set in Dorset
Novels first published in serial form
Novels set on islands